Michal Grinstein-Weiss, PhD, MSW, MA, is the Shanti K. Khinduka Distinguished Professor at the George Warren Brown School of Social Work at Washington University in St. Louis where she is also serves as the Associate Dean for Policy Initiatives, the director of the university-wide Social Policy Institute, and the founding director of the Centene Center for Health Transformation. She serves as a nonresident senior fellow at the Brookings Institution. She previously held positions as a professor at the University of North Carolina at Chapel Hill where she established the Asset-Building Research Group.

Education and academic career
Dr. Grinstein-Weiss received her Ph.D. in social work at the Brown School at Washington University in St. Louis, her M.A. in economics from the University of Missouri, St. Louis, and her MSW and B.A. from Haifa University, Israel. After obtaining her PhD, she became a postdoctoral fellow at the Center for Social Development at Washington University in St. Louis and later joined University of North Carolina - Chapel Hill as a faculty member, where she founded the Asset-Building Research Group. In July 2012, Grinstein-Weiss merged her center with the Center for Social Development at Washington University in St. Louis. In 2015, she founded the Centene Center for Health Transformation, an industry-academic research collaboration with Fortune 100 company Centene Corporation.

She has held leadership roles with the Clinton Global Initiative and was identified as one of the highest-impact social work scholars by research on social work practice. Her honors include induction into the American Academy of Social Work and Social Welfare, the Deborah K. Padgett Early Career Achievement Award, and the Smith Richardson Foundation Domestic Public Policy Research Fellowship. Dr. Grinstein-Weiss is associate policy editor for Behavioral Science and Policy and associate editor for Journal of the Society for Social Work and Research.

Research
As a leading researcher in social mobility, Dr. Grinstein-Weiss is an influential voice in the design of innovative social policies in the United States and internationally. She conducts research on improving health and socio-economic mobility for low-income households by creating scalable, evidence-based interventions to inform and shape policy, domestically and internationally. Currently, she leads several large-scale research initiatives promoting financial inclusion and health equity through unique industry-academic and government-academic partnerships.

Research partnerships
Dr. Grinstein-Weiss has been supported by government agencies including the U.S. Department of Treasury, U.S. Department of Education, U.S. Department of Health and Human Services, and the Consumer Financial Protection Bureau. In addition, her research won the support of philanthropic foundations such as the JPMorgan Chase Foundation, Ford Foundation, MacArthur Foundation, Smith Richardson Foundation, and Annie E. Casey Foundation. She also works closely in collaborations with industry partners, including Fortune-500 partners Intuit Inc. and Centene Corporation.

Child development accounts
In addition to her most recent research efforts, Dr. Grinstein-Weiss is the principal investigator for a 10-year follow-up study of the American Dream Demonstration (ADD), the first large-scale test of Individual Development Accounts (IDAs) in the world. She also serves as consultant to the Israeli government on developing innovative universal savings policies and Child Development Accounts (CDAs).

Grinstein-Weiss was instrumental in the effort to create equal opportunities for children in Israel and narrow income gaps for the next generation through the establishment of child development accounts. The Knesset, Israel's national legislature, passed legislation in November 2015 that authorizes the development of and funding for long-term savings accounts for all newborns. Every baby born to an insured resident of Israel on or after January 1, 2017, will have an account established for his or her benefit.

Centene Center for Health Transformation
Grinstein-Weiss is the Founding Director of the Centene Center for Health Transformation, a unique academic-industry collaboration between the Brown School at Washington University in St. Louis, the Center for Advanced Hindsight at Duke University, and Centene Corporation. The center leverages the insights of Fortune 100-company Centene Corporation and subsidiary Envolve on managed care, along with the research and evaluation expertise of the Brown School and Duke University to design, implement, and evaluate behavior-based innovations that facilitate healthier living. The Centene Center's research goals include improving the effectiveness and reach of health programs, serving as a model organization for translational research, training, implementation and dissemination, and contributing to the scientific evidence about what works in changing health behavior, improving health outcomes, and facilitating fuller lives for consumers.

Grinstein-Weiss provides overall strategic, organizational, and scientific leadership for the Center along with the faculty directors and staff. She also serves as the faculty director in the Center's Washington University Behavioral Economics workgroup, using behavior-based strategies from the social sciences to shift the perspectives and environments in which people make decisions to improve participation, outcomes, and overall effectiveness of healthcare interventions.

Financial Behaviors and Inclusion
Grinstein-Weiss leads several financial behavior and inclusion initiatives. For example, she leads financial wellness programs (FWPs) research and initiatives. In recent years, the number of FWPs have increased significantly, yet they operate at a small scale, and evidence concerning their efficacy is limited. New, scalable models must be developed to reach and serve economically vulnerable populations. Employer-sponsored FWPs have the potential to reach low- to moderate-income households at a much larger scale than community-based programs and in a financially sustainable manner. Also, employer-sponsored FWPs are promising because of an existing stable infrastructure for delivery.

Grinstein-Weiss also leads the Refund to Savings (R2S) Initiative, among other financial initiatives. R2S is the largest saving experiment conducted in the United States to date. R2S is a collaboration of academic researchers and tax industry experts from the Center for Social Development at Washington University in St. Louis, Duke University, and Intuit Inc., the maker of TurboTax tax preparation software. R2S builds a saving-promotion experiment into the TurboTax Free File Online product that is available free to low- and moderate-income households. R2S experiments measure the effect of behavioral economics techniques using a randomized controlled trial with the goal of increasing savings at tax time. The tax refund is the largest check most households receive all year, and because it is outside of normal budgets and income, it may present a golden moment to increase families’ financial security.

Dissemination efforts
Her research crosses disciplines, informing policy makers, scholars in diverse fields, industry leaders, and practitioners. She has written numerous scholarly research articles that have appeared in a broad range of publications, including American Economic Journal, Social Service Review, Journal of Marriage and the Family, Children and Youth Services Review, Journal of Income Distribution, as well as other prominent research journals and government publications. Her work has been featured in numerous media outlets such as the Wall Street Journal, New York Times, CNBC, C-SPAN, CNN, NBS, National Public Radio, Forbes, Chicago Policy Review, and Daily Finance.

References

External links
 Grinstein-Weiss's Google Scholar Page

21st-century American economists
Living people
Washington University in St. Louis faculty
Year of birth missing (living people)
George Warren Brown School of Social Work alumni
University of Missouri–St. Louis alumni
University of Haifa alumni
Washington University in St. Louis fellows